The Union of Communists in Bulgaria (SKB) is a communist party in Bulgaria, registered in 1995. It has participated in all elections since then, alone or in coalition. On 23 June 2013, the Central Committee of the Union of Communists in Bulgaria accepted the resignation of its then presiding chairman Kostadin Chakarov (2010–2013), a former adviser to Todor Zhivkov, and elected by an overwhelming majority Pavel Ivanov as the new chairman of the party.

The Union of Communists takes its name from Union of German and European Communists, established in the 19th century by Karl Marx and Friedrich Engels. It unites citizens and adopts Marxism as its political creed. The Union of Communists in Bulgaria considers itself the conceptual and political heir of Bulgarian Communist Party. In the 2013 parliamentary election the party received 6,168 votes (0.17% of the popular vote), remaining outside parliament.

See also
 Bulgarian Communist Party – Marxists
 Bulgarian United Communist Party

External links
Official website of the Union of Communists in Bulgaria
Facebook group of the Communist movement "Che Guevara" - Bulgaria

1995 establishments in Bulgaria
Communist parties in Bulgaria
Eurosceptic parties in Bulgaria
Political parties established in 1995
Marxist parties
Left-wing parties
Far-left political parties